Marie Åsberg (born 1938) is a Swedish psychiatrist. She was based at the Karolinska Institute until retirement in 2004.

In a pioneering 1976 paper, Åsberg found a link between low serotonin and violent suicide.

Åsberg is an expert on burnout, and the need for self-care. She has developed the concept of an 'exhaustion funnel', to illustrate the way in which preoccupations can be narrowed by over-concentration on work.

She was the 2022 recipient of the ECNP Neuropsychopharmacology (ENA) Award, which recognises exceptional research achievements in applied and translational neuroscience.

Works
 (with Lil Träskman and Peter Thorén) '5-HIAA in the Cerebrospinal Fluid: A Biochemical Suicide Predictor?', Archives of General Psychiatry. Vol. 33 (1976), pp.1193-1197.
 The CPRS : development and applications of a psychiatric rating scale. Copenhagen : Munksgaard, 1978.
 (with Stuart A. Montgomery) 'A New Depression Scale Designed to be Sensitive to Change'. 
 (ed. with Michael A. Jenike) Understanding obsessive-compulsive disorder (OCD) : an international symposium held during the VIIIth World Congress of Psychiatry, Athens, Greece, October 1989. Toronto: Hogrefe & Huber Publishers, 1991.
 'Neurotransmitters and Suicidal Behavior: The evidence from cerebrospinal fluid studies', Annals of the New York Academy of Sciences, 2006.

References

1938 births
Living people
Swedish psychiatrists
Swedish women psychiatrists